Muhittin Sarıçiçek is a Turkish Greco-Roman wrestler competing in the 87 kg division. He is a member of İstanbul Büyükşehir Belediyesi S.K.

Career 
Muhittin Sarıçiçek captured bronze medal in men's Greco-Roman 87 kg at 2018 World Juniors Wrestling Championships.

References

External links 
 

Turkish male sport wrestlers
Living people
1999 births
20th-century Turkish people
21st-century Turkish people